Lights Out is a 1923 American silent crime drama film directed by Alfred Santell and starring Ruth Stonehouse, Walter McGrail and Theodore von Eltz. It is based on the 1922 play Lights Out by Paul Dickey and Mann Page, later adapted into the 1938 film Crashing Hollywood. The remake was more light-hearted than the melodramatic tone of the original.

Synopsis
Two criminals encounter a screenwriter on a train and persuade him to create a screenplay about the criminal underworld. In an attempt to revenge themselves on one of their former associates, they negatively depict him in the work. After seeing the film he heads to the film studio seeking revenge.

Cast
 Ruth Stonehouse as 	'Hairpin' Annie
 Walter McGrail as Sea Bass
 Marie Astaire as 	Barbara
 Theodore von Eltz as 	'Eggs' 
 Ben Deeley as 'High-Shine' Joe
 Hank Mann as Ben
 Ben Hewlett as 	Keith Forbes
 Mabel Van Buren as Mrs. Gallant
 Fred Kelsey as Decker
 Harry Fenwick as Peyton
 Chester Bishop as Bangs, a movie director
 Max Asher as 	Wellabach, a movie producer

References

Bibliography
 Connelly, Robert B. The Silents: Silent Feature Films, 1910-36, Volume 40, Issue 2. December Press, 1998.
 Goble, Alan. The Complete Index to Literary Sources in Film. Walter de Gruyter, 1999.
 Munden, Kenneth White. The American Film Institute Catalog of Motion Pictures Produced in the United States, Part 1. University of California Press, 1997.

External links
 

1923 films
1923 drama films
1920s English-language films
American silent feature films
Silent American drama films
Films directed by Alfred Santell
American black-and-white films
Film Booking Offices of America films
American films based on plays
Films about filmmaking
1920s American films